Beacon Hill Tunnel may refer to one of the following:

Beacon Hill Tunnel (Hong Kong)
Beacon Hill tunnel (Seattle)
Beacon Hill Tunnel (South Africa)